Ramesh K. Agarwal is the William Palm Professor of Engineering in the department of Mechanical Engineering and Materials Science at Washington University in St. Louis. He is also the director of Aerospace Engineering Program, Aerospace Research and Education Center and Computational Fluid Dynamics Laboratory at WUSTL. From 1994 to 1996, he was the Sam Bloomfield Distinguished Professor and Chair of Aerospace Engineering department at Wichita State University in Wichita, Kansas. From 1996 to 2001, he was the Bloomfield Distinguished Professor and the executive director of the National Institute for Aviation Research at Wichita State University. Agarwal received Ph.D in Aeronautical Sciences from Stanford University in 1975, M.S. in Aeronautical Engineering from the University of Minnesota in 1969 and B.S. in Mechanical Engineering from Indian Institute of Technology, Kharagpur, India in 1968.

Research work

Agarwal has worked mostly in computational simulation of fluid flows. He developed a third-order upwind scheme in 1981 for the numerical integration of Navier-Stokes equations and did some of the early calculations of transonic wing-body interactions for aircraft. He has also worked in control systems and numerical simulation of carbon sequestration. He also proposed the Wray-Agarwal one-equation turbulence model in 2015 which is a linear eddy viscosity model, derived from a k–omega turbulence model closure.

Recognition
Dr. Agarwal has been honored with the Reed Aeronautics Award and is a fellow of several professional and honorary societies, including the Royal Aeronautical Society

References

External links
 

1947 births
Living people
University of Minnesota College of Science and Engineering alumni
IIT Kharagpur alumni
Computational fluid dynamicists
Stanford University School of Engineering alumni
Washington University in St. Louis faculty
Indian emigrants to the United States
Fellows of the American Physical Society